The Seattle Times Company is a privately owned publisher of daily and weekly newspapers in the U.S. state of Washington. Founded in Seattle, Washington in 1896, the company is now in its fourth and fifth generations of ownership by the Blethen family.

Properties 
In its headquarters city of Seattle, the company owns Washington's largest-circulation daily newspaper, The Seattle Times. Elsewhere in Washington, the company owns the Yakima Herald-Republic and Walla Walla Union-Bulletin.

Maine-native schoolteacher and attorney Alden J. Blethen bought the Seattle Press-Times in 1896, renaming it the Seattle Daily Times and doubling its circulation to 7,000 six months later. When he died in 1915, the Times' circulation was 70,000.

The two smaller dailies were added much later. The Walla Walla Union-Bulletin was purchased from the Kelly family in 1971, while the Yakima Herald-Republic was bought in 1991.

Issaquah Press Inc. 
The Seattle Times Company acquired Issaquah Press Inc. July 1, 1995, from Pacific Publishing Company. Originally consisting of one newspaper, the King County chain added two more in the 1990s. Based at 45 Front Street South, Issaquah, Washington.

The company and its newspapers ceased publication in February 2017.

 The Issaquah Press
 Founded in 1900, The Issaquah Press was the newspaper of record for Issaquah, Washington. It reached 20,000 homes in Issaquah every week.
 Newcastle News
 A monthly newspaper serving Newcastle, Washington, that debuted five years after the city was incorporated. The Newcastle News was mailed free to 5,000 homes in Newcastle.
 Sammamish Review
 Founded as a monthly in 1992, the Sammamish Review became a weekly in 2007 and was delivered free to 15,000 homes in Sammamish, Washington, every Wednesday.
 SnoValley Star
 The SnoValley Star's first issue was published March 6, 2008. The free-distribution weekly newspaper reached 12,400 homes and businesses in North Bend and Snoqualmie, Washington.

Other 
In addition to various websites associated with its newspaper properties, The Seattle Times Company also owns Rotary Offset Press, a printing company in Kent, Washington.

Maine newspapers 

For about a decade, from 1998 to mid-2009, The Seattle Times Company owned three daily newspapers and three weeklies in the state of Maine, as part of a subsidiary called Blethen Maine Newspapers. It sold these properties to private investors in 2009, who formed MaineToday Media.

Blethen Maine Newspapers was built in one acquisition, Seattle Times' purchase of all the newspapers formerly published by Guy Gannett Communications (not related to the larger Gannett chain). Guy Gannett managers said they sold to The Seattle Times Company because of shared values—both companies were fourth-generation family-owned news organizations.

"Of all the companies in the newspaper business, The Seattle Times is one most like our company in the sense of independence, of family ownership, and commitment to the community," said Guy Gannett spokesman Tim O'Meara.

Blethen Maine Newspapers' properties included the state's largest daily, the Portland Press Herald and Maine Sunday Telegram; the Kennebec Journal and the Morning Sentinel; along with their related weeklies. This purchase was estimated to have cost about $213 million.

References

External links 

 The Seattle Times Company Website
 The Seattle Times Website

 
Companies based in Seattle
McClatchy